Foundling is the ninth studio album by English singer-songwriter David Gray. The double album was released on 16 August 2010 in the United Kingdom and on the following day in the United States, by Mercer Street/Downtown Records.

Album information
Foundling was announced after plans for a reissue of Gray's preceding album, Draw the Line, were cancelled. The reissue was scheduled to include B-sides and unreleased tracks from the Draw the Line sessions, which included "A Moment" (released as the first single under the new title "A Moment Changes Everything"), "Old Father Time", and "More to Me Now".

Described as a "private record", Gray states that he has "never taken the dynamics [as] low as I have done on this record. I had to have faith in writing and understatement — the things I hold as my strengths. I'm as proud of it as anything I've done." Gray's commercial expectations, however, were low: "This record is going to disappear off the face of the earth, bar some freak occurrence." Foundling is described as "the closing chapter for Draw The Line, and...needs to be presented in a different way."

Critical reception

The album received mixed-to-negative reviews. The Guardian said it was "nothing new" but "high-quality adult pop". The Daily Telegraph wrote that the album "is unlikely to win Gray new fans but is as rich and heartfelt as admirers have come to expect." The Independent gave the album 2 out of 5 stars and called it "fairly grim" and "so swaddled in 'poetic' obfuscation it's hard to summon enough interest to decode [it]", adding that while Foundling is "restrained, understated, graceful," it is "unlikely to repeat White Ladders success." MusicOMH also gave the album 2 out of 5 stars, saying it "does become slightly wearisome after a while." Drowned in Sound gave Foundling a 6/10 rating, calling it "out of time, often boring, but...just too competent to lend itself to any fun." The Evening Standard called the album "safe", but Q magazine, on the other hand, wrote that Gray is "getting more interesting with each release". Review aggregator AnyDecentMusic? collated ten reviews, resulting in an "ADM Rating" of 5.7.

Track listing

Personnel
 David Gray – vocals, guitar, piano, harmonium, Wurlitzer, suitcase organ, harmonica, synth, vox organ
 Keith Prior – drums, percussion
 Robbie Malone – bass, acoustic and electric guitars, bouzouki, harmonium, backing vocals
 Neill MacColl – acoustic and electric guitars, backing vocals
 James Hallawell – piano on "Davey Jones' Locker"
 Iestyn Polson – programming on "Holding On" and bass piano on "Foundling"
 Caroline Dale – cellos on "Forgetting"
 Felim Gormley – saxophone on "Foundling" and "We Can Fall in Love Again"
 Andy Warrington – hurdy-gurdy on "In God's Name"
 Tim Bradshaw – guitar on "A New Day at Midnight"
 Dave Nolte – keyboards on "A New Day at Midnight"

Charts

References

David Gray (musician) albums
Polydor Records albums
2010 albums
Albums produced by Iestyn Polson